Acraea bellona is a butterfly in the family Nymphalidae. It is found in Angola.

Description
Close to Acraea acrita qv.

Taxonomy
It is a member of the Acraea  acrita species group.

Acraea (group acrita)  Henning, 1993, Metamorphosis 4 (1): 12 
Acraea (Acraea) (supraspecies acrita) Pierre & Bernaud, 2013, Butterflies of the World 39: 2, pl. 4, f. 11-12 
Acraea (Rubraea) Henning & Williams, 2010, Metamorphosis 21 (1): 10

References

External links

Die Gross-Schmetterlinge der Erde 13: Die Afrikanischen Tagfalter. Plate XIII 59 f

Butterflies described in 1908
bellona
Endemic fauna of Angola
Butterflies of Africa